Krishan Alang (born 19 September 1991) is an Indian cricketer. He made his Twenty20 debut for Punjab in the 2018–19 Syed Mushtaq Ali Trophy on 27 February 2019. He made his first-class debut on 4 February 2020, for Punjab in the 2019–20 Ranji Trophy.

References

External links
 

1991 births
Living people
Indian cricketers
Punjab, India cricketers